Pool C (Ulcinj) of the 2022 Billie Jean King Cup Europe/Africa Zone Group III was one of three pools in the Europe/Africa zone of the 2022 Billie Jean King Cup. Four teams competed in a round robin competition, with each team proceeding to their respective sections of the play-offs: the top team played for advancement to Group II in 2023.

Standings 

Standings are determined by: 1. number of wins; 2. number of matches; 3. in two-team ties, head-to-head records; 4. in three-team ties, (a) percentage of matches won (head-to-head records if two teams remain tied), then (b) percentage of sets won (head-to-head records if two teams remain tied), then (c) percentage of games won (head-to-head records if two teams remain tied), then (d) Billie Jean King Cup rankings.

Round-robin

Armenia vs. Moldova

Morocco vs. Mauritius

Armenia vs. Mauritius

Morocco vs. Moldova

Armenia vs. Morocco

Moldova vs. Mauritius

References

External links 
 Billie Jean King Cup website

2022 Billie Jean King Cup Europe/Africa Zone